Green Eyes is a novel by Lucius Shepard published in 1984.

Plot
Green Eyes is a novel in which modified bacteria revive newly dead people.

Reception
Dave Langford reviewed Green Eyes for White Dwarf #93, and stated that "It's a richly strange, decaying world that you see through those green eyes."

Reviews
Review by Faren Miller (1984) in Locus, #278 March 1984
Review by Don D'Ammassa (1984) in Science Fiction Chronicle, #57 June 1984
Review by Algis Budrys (1984) in The Magazine of Fantasy & Science Fiction, July 1984
Review by Fredrica K. Bartz (1984) in Fantasy Review, September 1984
Review by Frank Catalano (1984) in Amazing Stories, November 1984
Review by Tom Easton (1984) in Analog Science Fiction/Science Fact, November 1984
Review by Norman Spinrad (1984) in Isaac Asimov's Science Fiction Magazine, December 1984
Review by C. J. Henderson (1984) in Whispers #21-22, December 1984
Review by Colin Greenland (1985) in Foundation, #33 Spring 1985
Review by Chris Bailey (1986) in Vector 134
Review by Don D'Ammassa (1998) in Science Fiction Chronicle, #198 July-August 1998
Review by John Newsinger (1998) in Vector 201
Review by Graham Sleight (2009) in Locus, #577 February 2009

References

1984 American novels